Come On, Feel It is the first studio album by the American pop/rock band Baumer, released on August 30, 2005.  It is the follow-up to their first self-produced album, Family of Geniuses.

Track listing 
All songs written by Baumer

Personnel

Band 
 Nate Boykin – Vocals, synth
 Chris Corley – Bass
 Kenny McWilliams – Guitar
 Caleb Weathersby – Drums

Production 
 Baumer – Producer
 Greg Davis – Additional engineering, bass on track 5
 Mike Shipley – Mixer
 Brad Blackwood – Mastering
 Greg Edgerton – Art Direction
 Kyle Kraszewski – Art Direction
 Bo Streeter – Photography

References 

2005 albums
Baumer (band) albums